Frederick William Teschemaker (1834 –  21 November 1878) was a 19th-century Member of Parliament in Canterbury, New Zealand.

He represented the Gladstone electorate from 1876 to 1878, when he died.

References

1834 births
1878 deaths
Members of the New Zealand House of Representatives
New Zealand MPs for South Island electorates
19th-century New Zealand politicians